Cadwallader Blayney, 10th Baron Blayney (1769 – 2 April 1784) became a lord in 1775, and lived on the family estate in Castleblayney, Ireland. He died in 1784.

References

1769 births
1784 deaths
Barons Blayney